Zoya Afroz, (born 10 January 1994) is an Indian actress, model and a beauty pageant titleholder. Afroz won the title of Miss India International 2021 competing at the Glamanand Supermodel India contest and will represent India at the Miss International 2022 beauty pageant in Japan. Afroz was previously crowned as the second runner-up at Femina Miss India 2013.

Her first appearance was as a child artist in the television series Kora Kagaz in 1998 and continued to do so in films Hum Saath Saath Hain (1999), Mann (1999) and Kuch Naa Kaho (2003). In 2014, Afroz made her Bollywood screen debut as an adult in the thriller film The Xposé, which emerged as a commercial success. Afroz has also worked in various television commercials since she was a child artist. Afroz promotes education for girls and offers help to women in marginalized sections in acquiring financial independence. She works towards aiding women to acquire basic knowledge and supports the rights of women to get equal opportunity.

Early life and education
Originally hailing from Gorakhpur, Uttar Pradesh, Zoya Afroz was born in Lucknow, Uttar Pradesh in a Muslim family, to Shadaab and Saleha Afroz. She started working in Indian films, television series and commercials since the age of three. She attended R N Shah High School in Mumbai. She subsequently attended Mithibai College in Vile Parle, Mumbai, where she acquired her Bachelor of Commerce degree.

Career

1998–2005: (Beginnings)
Afroz started her career when she was 3 years old. She got her break from the Rasna sponsored Mahasearch Contest at the age of 3, after which she was featured in a commercial for the same. 
She appeared in the television series Kora Kagaz in 1998. She was spotted by Rajshri Productions and was offered a role in Hum Saath Saath Hain (1999). She played the role of Neelam Kothari's daughter in the film, which was a commercial and box-office success.

She later appeared in films like Mann (1999) and Kuch Naa Kaho (2003). She then acted in the children's fantasy adventure television series Son Pari. She played the role of young Goddess Parvati in DD National's series Jai Mata Ki which aired in the year 2000. As a child, she has appeared in television commercials for several brands like Whirlpool, Shoppers Stop, Jatt Airways and New York Life Insurance.

2012–present
At the age of 17, she worked in a Punjabi movie titled Sadi Gali Aaya Karo  (2012). As an adult, she made her Bollywood debut in 2014 film, The Xposé. Taran Adarsh described her role by stating: “The leading lady, Zoya Afroz [as Chandni], looks glamorous and had enacted her parts in the film with confidence”. She was later signed up in a Tamil movie titled Thamizhan Endru Sol, but the film was unreleased.

In 2017, Afroz appeared as a lead alongside Himansh Kohli in the film Sweetiee Weds NRI. She expressed - “I was waiting for such a film. So when it came, I grabbed it with both my hands. Earlier, the film I did has quite a serious role. This one is quite fun and I wanted to do something that could connect with the youth and I could play my age onscreen.” She worked in a Tamil film Paamban in 2019. She modelled for the 2020 edition of the annual Kingfisher Calendar in Western Cape, South Africa, and was featured in the March and June pages for the same. She was cast as a lead in the Hindi film Kabaad - The Coin, along with Vivaan Shah. The film was released digitally on February 13, 2021, on Voot. Afroz was signed up in a MX Player's thriller web show titled 'Matsya Kaand', and she will co-star alongside Ravi Dubey and Madhur Mittal. She was selected as a main cast in a spy thriller called 'Mukhbir - The Story of a Spy'.

Afroz has also been featured in television commercials and print ads for various brands and products, including Pond's, KFC, Asian Paints, Parliament Basmati Rice, OnePlus, LG, Maruti Suzuki Dzire Century Plyboards and Coca-Cola.

Pageantry

Femina Miss India

Afroz competed in the Femina Miss Indore 2013 contest at the age of 18, where she won the title. She acquired a direct entry as a contestant in the Femina Miss India 2013 pageant. At the end of the grand finale event held on 24 March 2013, in Yash Raj Studios, Mumbai, Afroz was crowned as the second runner-up by Rochelle Rao, Miss India International 2012 (and Top 15 of Miss International 2012).

Afroz was initially considered to represent India at Miss International 2013 by the Miss India Organization. However, subsequently when Miss Diva 2013 was organized, Gurleen Grewal, the edition's 1st runner-up was selected as Miss India International 2013.

Glamanand Supermodel India
Afroz competed in the 2021 edition of the Glamanand Supermodel India pageant. The grand finale event was held at the Kingdom of Dreams, Gurgaon, Haryana in NCR Delhi on 21 August 2021. There, she bagged three sub-titles, namely - Best in Evening Gown, Miss Glamorous Eyes and Top Model.

During the final question and answer round of  Femina Miss India 2017, the top 5 delegates were asked the same question - “What is the role of a beauty pageant in a country that lacks unity?”, to which Afroz responded:
"As someone who has dreamt to be on stage of such a prestigious pageant, I believe that beauty pageants give great opportunities to young women to excel in their career, and in whichever field they choose to pursue. Beauty pageants recognises that and gives them wings to fly and strengthen and empower them. So, I believe that in our country where we have so much unity, yet so much diversity, a beauty pageant brings girls from different cultures all together, and they get so much to learn from each other, as opposed to the countries which lacks unity. I really feel that pageants helps women to reach their highest potential, and makes them united."

At the end of the event, she was crowned as Miss India International 2021, besting 23 other contestants. Thereby, she will represent India at the Miss International 2022 pageant to be held during the fall of 2022, in Yokohama City, Japan.

Filmography

Films

Television

Web series

Music Videos

Awards and nominations

References

External links

 Official Zoya Afroz Facebook
 Official Zoya Afroz Twitter
 Official Zoya Afroz Youtube

Female models from Uttar Pradesh
Indian beauty pageant winners
Femina Miss India winners
Living people
1994 births
Actresses from Lucknow
Miss International 2021 delegates